Austria competed at the 1994 Winter Paralympics in Lillehammer, Norway. 38 competitors from Austria won 35 medals including 7 gold, 16 silver and 12 bronze and finished 6th in the medal table.

See also 
 Austria at the Paralympics
 Austria at the 1994 Winter Olympics

References 

Austria at the Paralympics
1994 in Austrian sport
Nations at the 1994 Winter Paralympics